Bjelleklang (Norwegian: lit. Bell Sounds, coll. Jingle Bells) is a Norwegian a cappella vocal group formed in Lørenskog in 1986.

The group performs both songs with only a cappella and songs with guitar or other unconventional music instruments like stir pans or pots. The repertoire includes songs written by its members and cover songs with Norwegian lyrics, often translated from English with a humoristic twist.

Their first album, Dæng Dæng, was released in 1991;  they have published eight studio albums and one best-of album, all produced by Håkon Iversen. The debut album and several others have gone gold or platinum. Holiholihooo ..., released in 1992, is their best-selling album, with more than 70,000 copies sold, and the single "Gud! hvor du er deilig" sold 40,000.

"Feit" (1990), "Hyttetur" (1991), "Mercedes Benz" (1992) and "Gummihatt" (1994) reached the top 10 on the VG-lista singles chart, and "Gud! Hvor du er deilig" (1996) reached #1. On the albums chart, Dæng dæng (1991), Holiholihooo ... (1992), Ypper'u donk (1994) and Kort ved øra (1996) reached the top 5.

Members
 Finn Evensen (1986-)
 Per Henrik Gusrud (1999-)
 Robert Skrolsvik (1986-)
 Carl Einar Traaen (2002-)
 Frank Øren (1989-)

Former members 
 Ole Jørgen Holt Hanssen (1986-1999)
 Jon Haaland (1986-1996) 
 Arvid Rønsen Ruud (1986-1995)
 Geir Havenstrøm (1986-1987)
 Ketil Hustad (1987-1990)
 Øystein Skre (1996-2001)

Discography 
 Dæng Dæng (BMG Ariola, 1991)
 Holiholihooo … (BMG Ariola, 1992)
 Ypperu’ Donk (BMG Ariola, 1994)
 Synger svart (BMG Ariola, 1995)
 Kort ved øra (BMG Ariola, 1996)
 Kjære landsmenn (RCA, 1997)—best-of
 Spis meg rå (BMG Ariola, 1998)
 Jul med Bjelleklang (Columbia, 1999) 
 Sokker i sandaler (Big Box Music, 2006)
 Menn, menn, menn (Big Box Music, 2009)

References

External links 
 Official homepage

Norwegian musical groups
A cappella musical groups
Melodi Grand Prix contestants
Musical groups established in 1986
1986 establishments in Norway
Musical groups from Akershus
Lørenskog